Medog frog may refer to:

 Medog bubble-nest frog, a frog found in China
 Medog eastern frog, a frog found in China and India
 Medog spiny frog, a frog endemic to Tibet, China

Animal common name disambiguation pages